Bulinus obtusispira is a species of a tropical freshwater snail with a sinistral shell, an aquatic gastropod mollusk in the family Planorbidae, the ramshorn snails and their allies.

Distribution 
The type locality is about 32 km far from Tananarive, Madagascar.

Description 
The width of the shell is 6.5 mm. The height of the shell is 8.8 mm.

References

Bulinus
Gastropods described in 1882
Endemic fauna of Madagascar